Tulio Chiossone Villamizar (16 September 1905 – 26 December 2001) was a Venezuelan historian, writer, jurist and criminal lawyer, humanist, scholar, judge, legislator, politician, scholar and writer.

Works published
Annotations to the first book of the Penal Code, Printer, Mérida, 1930.
Annotations to the Venezuelan Penal Code, Volume I, Editorial South America, Caracas, 1932.
Child offenders. Typography Pencil, Mérida, 1935.
Venezuelan prison reform, Graphic Arts, Caracas, 1936.
The organization of prisons in Venezuela, Typographic Arts Cooperative, Caracas, 1936.
Annotations to the Venezuelan Penal Code, Volumes I and II. Editorial Graphic Arts, Caracas, 1938.
Venezuelan Social Issues, American Typography, Caracas, 1949.
The term 'mental illness' in Venezuelan criminal law. American Typography, Caracas, 1952.
What transgressional in legal dynamics, Editorial El Cojo. Caracas, 1954.
Apuntaciones of prison law. Typography CTP San Juan de los Morros, 1954.
Social problems in the formation of the Venezuelan State, American Graphic, Caracas, 1964.
Criminal Procedure Manual (1st edition). Central University of Venezuela (UCV), Caracas, 1967.
General principles for a theory of transgression, UCV, Caracas, 1968.
Juvenile Behavior Disorders, UCV, Caracas, 1968.
Legal limits of imprisonment, UCV, Caracas, 1969.
Proposed reform of the code of criminal procedure, UCV, Caracas, 1972.
Criminal Procedure Manual. UCV, Caracas, 1972.
Venezuelan Criminal Law Handbook (1st edition). UCV, Caracas, 1972.
Medical confidentiality, UCV. Caracas, 1974.
The law and transgression, UCV, Caracas, 1975.
Theory of the offense, UCV, Caracas, 1976.
Contribution to the reform of criminal law Venezuela, UCV, Caracas, 1976.
And criminal procedural issues, UCV, Caracas, 1977.
Manual Venezuelan criminal procedural law. 3rd ed., UCV, Caracas, 1981.
Crimes against nature and the environment, UCV, Caracas, 1982.
Toponímico Dictionary of Venezuela. Monte Avila Editores, Caracas, 1992.
Tachira State History, Authors and Topics Tachira, Caracas, 1982.
Providing the Venezuelan indigenous languages into Castilian, National Academy of History, Caracas, 1993.

1905 births
2001 deaths
People from Rubio, Venezuela
Venezuelan Ministers of Interior
20th-century Venezuelan historians
Venezuelan male writers
Venezuelan people of Italian descent
20th-century male writers
Venezuelan jurists
Secretariat of the Presidency ministers of Venezuela